Inventive Designers is an Antwerp, Belgium based software development company, which belongs to the Unifiedpost group. The company was founded in 1994 by Guy Dehond and Patrick Morren.
Guy Dehond was one of the beta testers of the IBM AS/400 (codenamed "Silverlake") at IBM. Dehond and Morren had worked with this system for years, and their first products were for the AS/400 and its OS/400 operating system. Later they started to design products for cross-platform environments. Today, the company specializes in software for customer communications management in the public, financial, telecommunications, utility, insurance and healthcare industry, in over 30 countries.

In 2010, the company received a CIOnet Innovation Award.

The company participates in the AFP Consortium and the World Wide Web Consortium (W3C). At the W3C, Inventive Designers was active in the XSL Working Group, and Chief Technical Officer Klaas Bals was the editor of XSL Requirements 2.0 document. Currently, the company plays an active role in W3C's Forms Working Group.

At the end of 2012 Guy Dehond handed over the company to his daughter Joke Dehond and his son-in-law Klaas Bals.

In May 2017, Jim Verbist was named CEO of the company. In December 2018, the company was acquired by Unifiedpost.

Company timeline

References 

Software companies of Belgium
Belgian companies established in 1994
Companies based in Antwerp